Passon is a surname. Notable people with the surname include:

Felicity Passon, Seychellois swimmer
Ortwin Passon (born 1962), German activist
Stacie Passon (born 1969), American film director, screenwriter, and producer

See also
Michael Passons (born 1965), American singer-songwriter